Anthony Angel Labrusca Jr. (born August 7, 1995), professionally known as Tony Labrusca, is an American actor, model, and singer based in the Philippines. Labrusca first gained his popularity via a McDonald's Philippines TV ad in 2016, Tuloy Pa Rin.

In 2016, he joined the Philippine reality search Pinoy Boyband Superstar but did not make the cut to be part of the band. He was part of horror-fantasy drama series La Luna Sangre. The trailer of his latest film Glorious reached more than 5 million views on its first day of release.

Early life
Labrusca was born on August 7, 1995 in Houston, Texas in the United States. He is the son of Filipino actor Boom Labrusca and Filipina singer Angel Jones. He grew up in Los Angeles, California with his mother, step father (Boom Dayupay) and sister. When he was 9, his family moved to Vancouver, Canada. He then flew to the Philippines to pursue his career in show business.

Career 
Before Labrusca auditioned for Pinoy Boyband Superstar, he was already a face of various TV commercials. He became more popular when he played the guy who broke a girl's heart (Elisse Joson) in the viral McDonald's TV ad entitled Tuloy Pa Rin in 2016.

During his audition in Pinoy Boyband Superstar, he was unexpectedly reunited with his biological father, model and actor Boom Labrusca. He successfully became one of the top contenders and went up to the Top 7 for the grand finals. Unfortunately, he did not make it to the Top 5 as the final member of BoybandPH.

He made his acting debut in 2017 via TV5's Wattpad Presents with Louise delos Reyes. Later, he joined La Luna Sangre considered as his first break playing the role of Jake Arguelles. His character was set to become a third person in the love triangle between him, Kathryn Bernardo and Daniel Padilla.

In June 2020, Labrusca starred in the hit Filipino BL series, Hello Stranger (web series), along with his leading man JC Alcantara. The series proved popular even among international fans, which led to the Hello Stranger film in 2021. A second season is expected to be released soon.

Controversies
On January 3, 2019, shortly after landing at Ninoy Aquino International Airport (NAIA), Labrusca allegedly yelled curses at Bureau of Immigration officers after they stamped his passport for a 30-day stay only (the maximum visa-free stay in the Philippines for US passport holders). Labrusca was using his American passport at that time and had no work visa. However, he mistakenly believed that he was covered by the Balikbayan Program'''s one-year visa-free stay. A spokesperson of the Bureau of Immigration explained that the Balikbayan Program "is for former Filipinos and their immediate family members who are traveling with them. If these family members are not traveling with them, then they are not qualified." Labrusca was not accompanied by an immediate family member at that time. Labrusca was widely criticized for the incident, and Foreign Affairs Secretary Teodoro Locsin Jr. suggested his deportation. The following day, Labrusca apologized to the immigration officers and admitted that he did not know the full details of the Balikbayan Program, but maintained that he did not curse or shout at any officer.

In June 2021, Labrusca was charged with alleged acts of lasciviousness and slight physical injuries for an incident that happened 5 months before, on the night of January 16, 2021, where allegedly, a drunk Labrusca unstrapped a woman's top to expose her breasts before forcefully pulling her to sit on his lap. He also allegedly choked a man on that same night. In July, the physical injuries case was dismissed by the Makati prosecutor's office since the complaint was filed "more than two months from the date of its alleged commission, the crime is already extinguished by reason of prescription." In March 2022, the acts of lasciviousness case was dismissed citing no probable cause.

 Filmography 
 Television/Digital 

Film

Awards and nominations

 See also 
 Pinoy Boyband Superstar''

Notes

References 

1995 births
Living people
Male actors from Metro Manila
Filipino male television actors
Star Magic
ABS-CBN personalities
Filipino male models
Male actors from Houston
21st-century Filipino male actors